Archery events was held between 13 September to 15 September at Senayan Sports Complex.

Medal summary

Men

Women

Medal table

References
 http://eresources.nlb.gov.sg/newspapers/Digitised/Article/straitstimes19870914-1.2.43.35
 https://eresources.nlb.gov.sg/newspapers/Digitised/Article/straitstimes19870915-1.2.50.28.aspx
 http://eresources.nlb.gov.sg/newspapers/Digitised/Article/straitstimes19870916-1.2.46.13.12

1987 Southeast Asian Games
Southeast Asian Games
Archery at the Southeast Asian Games
International archery competitions hosted by Indonesia